China–Rwanda relations refer to the foreign relations between China and Rwanda. China and Rwanda established diplomatic relations on November 12, 1971.

Chinese gives finances to Rwanda
From 2000 to 2011, there were approximately 56 Chinese official development finance projects identified in Rwanda through various media reports. These projects range from a US$160 million debt cancellation in 2007, to financing the construction and operationalization of the cement factory (CIMERWA) at Bugarama in 2009, and an interest-free, 219 million RMB loan for the rehabilitation of the Kigali road network in 2009.

References

 
Rwanda
Bilateral relations of Rwanda